Sibirsky (masculine), Sibirskaya (feminine), or Sibirskoye (neuter) may refer to:
anything pertaining to Siberia, Russia
Siberian Federal District (Sibirsky federalny okrug), a federal district of Russia
Sibirsky Urban Okrug, a municipal formation which the closed administrative-territorial formation of Sibirsky in Altai Krai, Russia is incorporated as
Sibirsky (rural locality) (Sibirskaya, Sibirskoye), several rural localities in Russia
Siberian Route (Sibirsky trakt), a historic route which connected European Russia with Siberia and China
Sibirsky (family), a princely Genghisid family formerly living in Russia
Sibirskaya (Novosibirsk Metro), a station of the Novosibirsk Metro in Novosibirsk, Russia

See also
Siberia (disambiguation)
Siberian (disambiguation)
West Siberian economic region (Zapadno-Sibirsky ekonomichesky rayon), an economic region of Russia
East Siberian economic region (Vostochno-Sibirsky ekonomichesky rayon), an economic region of Russia